A bandy ball is a rubber ball used for playing bandy and rink bandy. Bandy balls are manufactured by companies such as Jofa, Kosa, and Reebok.

The core of the ball is made of cork and is surrounded by rubber or rubber-like plastic. Originally, bandy balls were red, then later became orange or cerise. According to the Bandy Playing Rules set up by the Federation of International Bandy, any of these are allowed, but all balls used in one game must be of the same colour and type.

A similar ball is used in the sport of rinkball but the rinkball ball is blue in color rather than the orange or cerise color seen in both bandy and rink bandy.

Bandy was originally played with a wooden ice hockey puck-like object, though balls were also used. However, it was not until around 1904–1905 that the major breakthrough for the ball became a reality.

References

See also
 Playing the ball in bandy

Ball
Ball
Balls